George Glenn Oder (born April 24, 1957) is an American politician. From 2002–2012 he served in the Virginia House of Delegates, representing the 94th district in the city of Newport News. He is a member of the Republican Party.

Notes

References

 Delegate Glenn Oder] (Constituent/campaign website)

External links

1957 births
Living people
Republican Party members of the Virginia House of Delegates
Virginia Tech alumni
Politicians from Newport News, Virginia
21st-century American politicians